Patriarch Maximus II or Patriarch Maximos II may refer to:

 Maximus II of Antioch, Patriarch in 449–455
 Maximus II of Constantinople, Ecumenical Patriarch in 1216
 Maximos II Hakim, Patriarch of the Melkite Greek Catholic Church in 1760–1761

See also
 Patriarch (disambiguation)
 Maximus (disambiguation)
 Patriarch Maximus I (disambiguation)